Brady Parks (born November 28, 1989 in Reno, Nevada) is an American songwriter and musician, and the lead singer of the American folk-pop band The National Parks. Brady was raised in Parker, Colorado. In early 2011, he moved to Provo, Utah to attend Brigham Young University where he became involved in the local music scene. He and Sydney Macfarlane performed as Brady Parks and the IndiAnns, which The National Parks evolved from in 2013.

Parks won First Place in the 2015 International Songwriting Competition for unsigned artists and has performed with his band at SXSW, CMJ Music Marathon, Make Music Pasadena, Canadian Music Week, and has headlined Provo, Utah's Rooftop Concert Series. Parks plays a STS205CENT Teton Guitar.

References 

21st-century American singers
American lyricists
American male singer-songwriters
Living people
Musicians from Provo, Utah
Musicians from Reno, Nevada
1989 births
Brigham Young University alumni
Singer-songwriters from Utah
Singer-songwriters from Nevada